Palaephatoidea is a superfamily of insects in the order Lepidoptera with a single family, Palaephatidae with seven known genera. These "Gondwanaland moths"  exhibit a disjunct distribution occurring mainly in South America (Davis, 1986), with four species in eastern Australia and Tasmania and one in South Africa (Davis, 1999). The larvae spin together leaves of Proteaceae (Ptyssoptera) or Verbenaceae (Azaleodes) (Nielsen, 1987).
Palaephatoidea, a typical monotrysian group, is one two main candidates as the sister group of most of the Lepidoptera, the Ditrysia (see Tischerioidea and also Wiegmann et al., 2002).

References

Davis, D.R. (1986). A new family of monotrysian moth from austral South America (Lepidoptera: Palaephatidae), with a phylogenetic review of the Monotrysia. Smithsonian Contributions to Zoology, 434: 1-202.
Davis, D.R. (1999). The Monotrysian Heteroneura. Ch. 6, pp. 65–90 in Kristensen, N.P. (Ed.). Lepidoptera, Moths and Butterflies. Volume 1: Evolution, Systematics, and Biogeography. Handbuch der Zoologie. Eine Naturgeschichte der Stämme des Tierreiches / Handbook of Zoology. A Natural History of the phyla of the Animal Kingdom. Band / Volume IV Arthropoda: Insecta Teilband / Part 35: 491 pp. Walter de Gruyter, Berlin, New York.
Nielsen, E.S. (1987). The recently discovered primitive (non-Ditrysian) family Palaephatidae (Lepidoptera) in Australia. Invertebrate Taxonomy, 1(2): 201-229.
Wiegmann, B.M., Regier, J.C. and Mitter, C. (2002). Combined molecular and morphological evidence on the phylogeny of the earliest lepidopteran lineages. Zoologica Scripta, 31(1): 67-81.

Sources
Firefly Encyclopedia of Insects and Spiders, edited by Christopher O'Toole, 2002

External links
Tree of Life
Azaleodes micronipha Australian Moths Online
Head

 
Moth families